Thana Khurd is a village in Kharkhoda, Sonipat district in the state of Haryana, India. It is situated 6km away from sub-district headquarter Kharkhoda and 21km away from district headquarter Sonipat.

Geography
Thana Khurd is located at 28.89°N to 76.95°E. It has an average elevation of 224.15 meters above sea level (735.4 feet). The total area of Thana Khurd is 557 hectares.

References

Villages in Sonipat district